The Theban Tomb TT44 is located in Sheikh Abd el-Qurna. It forms part of the Theban Necropolis, on the west bank of the Nile opposite Luxor. The tomb is the burial place of the ancient Egyptian Amenemhab, whose title was wab-priest in front of Amun. He dates to the Ramesside Period.

See also
 List of Theban tombs

References

Theban tombs
Nineteenth Dynasty of Egypt